Pauline Perry, Baroness Perry of Southwark (née Welch; born 15 October 1931) is an educator, educationist, academic, and activist. She is a Conservative politician and was for 25 years a working member of the British House of Lords. In 1981 she became Her Majesty's Chief Inspector of Schools in England. In 1986 she became Vice-Chancellor of South Bank Polytechnic, and serving during its transition to a university, became the first woman in history to run a British university.

Early life

Perry was educated at Wolverhampton Girls' High School and Girton College, Cambridge. where she read Moral Sciences (philosophy) and received her MA. For the next 10 years she taught philosophy, mainly at post-graduate level, teaching in  England, Canada and the USA.

In 1952 she married Oxford University lecturer George Perry, and had three sons and a daughter (Christopher, Timothy, Simon and Hilary).

Career

In 1970, Perry joined HM Inspectorate at the Department of Education and Science, and was appointed Chief Inspector in 1981. In 1986 she became Vice-Chancellor and Chief Executive of South Bank Polytechnic, and serving during its transition to a university became the first woman in history to run a British university. In 1994 she was elected President of Lucy Cavendish College, Cambridge. and served as Head of House for 7 years until 2001. She subsequently held other roles including pro-chancellor of the University of Surrey 2001-2005, Chair of Governors at Roehampton Institute 2001-2005 (which was granted university status in 2003).

In 1986, she collaborated with John Cassels and James Prior to create the Council for Industry and Higher Education (CIHE), which would become the National Centre for Universities and Business in 2013.

She has also been active in the Southwark Cathedral and Church of England community and the City of London. She was appointed by General Synod as chair of the review group examining the operation of the Crown Appointment Commission, the body which nominates Diocesan Bishops. The Perry Report "Working With The Spirit", was published in May 2001 and led to more transparent selection procedures for the appointment of Anglican Bishops. She was Rector’s Warden of Southwark Cathedral from 1990-1995.

Perry was awarded the Freedom of the City of London in 1991. She was a member of the Nuffield Council on Bioethics (2003–05), and chaired the Working Party on the Ethics of research involving animals. She has also served as Chair of the Commission on Secondary Reorganisation for the London Borough of Hammersmith and Fulham; Chair of the Commission on Academies and Free Schools in the London Borough of Wandsworth; Co-chair of The Conservatives Public Services Commission, which reported in 2007; and Chair of the Governing Body of Kaplan College and Law School, in 2013.

UK Parliament
On 16 July 1991, she became a life peer as The Right Honourable Baroness Perry of Southwark, of Charlbury in the County of Oxfordshire. She sits on the Conservative Party benches. She was appointed a Conservative Party Whip in the Lords in January 2011. She retired from the Lords on 26 May 2016.

Parliamentary Committees
Ecclesiastical Committee (Joint Committee) 2015-2016
Liaison Committee (Lords) 2015-2016
Hybrid Instruments Committee (Lords) 2014-16
Science and Technology: Sub-Committee I 2010-2011
Science and Technology Committee (Lords) 2009-14
Liaison Committee (Lords) 2007-12
Science and Technology: Sub-Committee I 2005-07
Science and Technology Committee (Lords) 2003-07
Committee On Religious Offences 2002-03
Ecclesiastical Committee (Joint Committee) Lords 2002-2015
Human Rights (Joint Committee)	2001-03
Delegated Powers and Regulatory Reform 1993-98
Science and Technology: Sub-Committee I 1993-95
Science and Technology Committee (Lords)  1992-95
Member House of Lords Select Committee on Science and Technology   1992-95, 1997-2005, 2008–10, 2010–14
Member House of Lords 1991-2016

The official record can be found on her House of Lords career page.

Appointments

2010 to 2019
 National Conference of University Profs (2016- )
 Chair Governing Body Kaplan Collage (2014–15)
 Abbey Schools (2012–14)
 Sub-Committee I [Higher education in STEM subjects] (2011–12)

2000 to 2009
 EU Sub-Committee G - Social Policies and Consumer Protection (2007–09)
 Co- Chairman Policy Group on Public Services, Cons Party (2006–07)
 Honorary Freeman of the Worshipful Company of Fishmongers (2006)
 Chair of City and Guilds Quality and Standards Committee (2005–10)
 Patron: British Friends of Neve Shalom-Watat al Salaam (2005)
 Chair, Inquiry into Energy Efficiency (2004–05)
 Inquiry into Animals in Scientific Experiments, Nuffield Council on Bio-Ethics (2003–05)
 President, Foundation for Higher Education (2002–06)
 Ecclesiastical Committee (2002–16)
 On Stem Cell Research (2001–02) 
 Chair of Governors and Trustee of Roehampton Institute, University of Surrey (2001-2006)
 Pro-Chancellor and Member of Council, University of Surrey (2001–06)
 President, Westminster & City Branch of Chartered Management Institute (2000–14)
 Vice President, City and Guilds of London Institute
 Vice President, British Youth Opera
 Governor of Gresham's School, Holt (2000–06)
 Governor, London South Bank Centre
 President, Council for Independent Education (CIFE) (2000–13)

1990 to 1999
 C of E Rec Cp on Operation of Crown Appointments Committee (1999-2001)
 Alexander Stone Lecturer in Rhetoric, Glasgow (1999)
 Judges Panel on Citizen’s Chatter (1997-2004)
 Trustee, Cambridge University Foundation (1997-2006) 
 Chairman All Party, Partly University Group (1996-2009)
 Royal Society Project Sci, Bd of Patron, (1995-2003)
 Relations between Central and Local Government, Committee on	Lords (1995–96)
 Chair, Friends of Southwark Cath (1994-2002)
 Vice-President C&G (1994–99)
 On Scrutiny of Delegated Power (1994–98)
 Chairman DTI Export Group of Education and Training Sector (1993–98)
 National Adv. Council on Education and Training Targets (1993–98)
 Ministry of Defence CCMI (CIMgt 1993)
 Trustee, Daphne Jackson Memorial Trust
 Companion of the Institute of Management
 Board of Directors, South Bank Centre, (1992–94)
 Vice Chancellor South Bank University (1992–93)
 NI Hughter Education Council (1992–94)
 British Youth Opera (1992-)
 Liveryman of the Worshipful Company of Bakers (1992)
 Freeman of the City of London (1992)
 Adv. on Police Training to Home Office (1991–93)
 Member Court, University of Bath (1991–99)
 Trustee, Bacon's City Technology College (1991–99)
 St Mark's Collage, Limpopo SA (1991)
 Rector's Warden Southward Cath (1990–94)

1980 to 1989
 ESRC (1988–91)
 FRSA (1988)
 Director South Bank Poly (1987–92)
 Governing Body Institute of Development Studies, Sussex Uni (1987–94)
 Member: Committee on International Co-Operation in Higher Education, British Council (1987–97)
 Chief Inspector, for Schools UK (1981)

1970 to 1979
 Staff Inspector (1975)
 HM Inspector of School (1970–86)

1960 to 1969
 Part time Lecturer in Education, Dept of Education Studies, Oxford University (1966–70)
 Tutor for Inservice Training, Berks (1966–70)
 Lecturer in Education (part time) University of Exeter (1962–66)
 University of Massachusetts at Salem, (1960–62)
 Lecturer in Philosophy: University of Manitoba (1957–59)
 Research Fellow, University of Manitoba (1956–57)
 High School Evaluator, New England USA (1959–61)
 Teacher in English Secondary Schools, Canadian and American High Schools (1953–54 and 1959–61)

Other Memberships (not dated)
 Political Editorial Advisor at i-MAGAZINE
 Member of the Institute of Directors
 Member of the International Women's Forum
 Patron, Women's Engineering Society
 Patron, St Mark’s School, Limpopo Province, South Africa

The list of appointments can be found in the Who's Who publication.

Honorary Doctorates and Fellowships
The Rt Hon Baroness Perry of Southwark has been awarded the following academic honorary doctorates and fellowships by university's world wide for her work.

Doctorates

Bath LL.D 1991 
Sussex D. Litt 1992 
Aberdeen LL.D 1994 
LSBU LLD 1994 
Wolverhampton ED.D 1994 
Surrey D.Univ 1995 
City D.Litt 2000 
Mercy College, New York. D.Ed 2014

Fellowships

City and Guilds of London (2000) 
Girton College, Cambridge (1995) 
London South Bank University (1994) 
Lucy Cavendish College, Cambridge (1987) 
Roehampton University 
College of Preceptors

Companion of the Institute of Management
Hon. Freeman of the Worshipful Company of Fishmongers (2006)
Freeman of the City of London (1992)

Books and Publishing's
She has published numerous articles, contributed chapters in 12 books, and published five books.

Published Books
 The Womb in Which I Lay: Daughters Finding Their Mothers in Life and in Death (published: 06 Mar. 2005) 
 Diversity and Excellence: A Contribution to the Debate (2001) 
 Case Studies in Adolescence (published: 01 Jan. 1970) 
 Your Guide to the Opposite Sex for the Under-twenties (published: 01 Jan. 1970) 
 Case Studies in Teaching Paperback (published: 01 Dec. 1969) 

Her book can be found on the authors page on Amazon and on Google Books.

Arms

References

Sources
House of Lords Register of Interests: Baroness Perry of Southwark, parliament.the-stationery-office.co.uk; accessed 1 April 2016.

1931 births
Living people
People from Wolverhampton
People educated at Wolverhampton Girls' High School
Alumni of Girton College, Cambridge
Life peeresses created by Elizabeth II
Conservative Party (UK) life peers
Vice-Chancellors of London South Bank University
Schoolteachers from the West Midlands
Civil servants in the Department of Education (United Kingdom)
English educational theorists
People associated with the University of Surrey
Presidents of Lucy Cavendish College, Cambridge
Fellows of Girton College, Cambridge